The Manipulus Vocabulorum is an English-to-Latin dictionary compiled in the 16th century.

The dictionary was produced by Peter Levens in 1570. It was reissued in 1867 by the Camden Society.  According to Smithsonian magazine, the Manipulus Vocabulorum was the world's first rhyming dictionary.

Copies of the Manipulus Vocabulorum are currently held at:

 British Library, London
 Bodleian Library, Oxford
 University of Illinois at Urbana–Champaign University Library

References

External links
 
 

Latin dictionaries
English dictionaries
16th-century books